Mădălin Ştefan Voicu (born 10 July 1952, in Bucharest) is a Romanian musician and politician of Romani ethnicity. Voicu is a member of the Social Democratic Party (PSD) and has been a parliamentarian in the Chamber of Deputies since 1996. He is one of only two ethnic Romani politicians in the current parliament; the other is Nicolae Păun, who holds the seat specifically reserved for a member of the Romani minority.

Mădălin is the son of Ion Voicu, a well-known Romani-Romanian musician. In his youth, he was close friends with Nicu Ceaușescu, the son of Communist Romania's leader Nicolae Ceaușescu, as well as with other young members of the nomenklatura.

Voicu graduated from the National University of Music, completed training as a conductor at various schools abroad, and was employed by orchestras in Craiova and Ploiești.

He began his political activity in 1994-1996 as a member of the defunct Party of Liberty and Social Unity (PLUS) and then became active in the Social Democratic Roma Party of Romania (PDSR). Voicu was elected to the seat reserved for minorities in the 1996-2000 legislature before running on the common PDSR-PSD list in 2000.

References

External links
 Mădălin Voicu at the Chamber of Deputies site
 Cristina Vohn, "Gașca lui Nicu Ceaușescu" ("Nicu Ceaușescu's Pack") - includes Voicu's own recollections, in Jurnalul Național, February 20, 2006

1952 births
Living people
Politicians from Bucharest
Voicu, Ion
Romanian Romani people
Social Democratic Party (Romania) politicians
Voicu, Ion
Voicu, Ion
Romani politicians
Romani violinists
21st-century conductors (music)
21st-century violinists
21st-century male musicians